Veselin Petrović (born 1 July 1977) is a Serbian professional basketball coach and former player. He currently works as an assistant coach for OKK Beograd of the Basketball League of Serbia.

Playing career
Petrović grew up with the Bosna Sarajevo youth teams. In 1993, he moved to KK Vojvodina, where he played for two seasons. He then moved to FMP Železnik, where he played for 4 years. In 1999, he signed with Partizan Belgrade, where he won three trophies. Later, he played another season with FMP Železnik, and one season with Budućnost. In 2004, he went to Belgium and played one season with Verviers-Pepinster. He then moved to the Belgian club Oostende, where he played until 2014.

Trophies won
Petrović was a member of the senior men's FR Yugoslavia national basketball team at the EuroBasket 2001, where he won a gold medal. With Partizan Belgrade, he won the 2001–02 season Yugoslav National League championship. In 2000 and 2002, he won the Serbian Cup. With FMP Železnik, he also won the Serbian Cup in 1997. With Oostende, where he began playing in 2005, he won the Belgian League championship in 2006, 2007, 2012, and 2013. He also won the Belgian Cup in 2008, 2010, and 2013.

Coaching career
Petrović worked as an assistant coach of the Serbian team Mega Bemax from 2015 to 2019. On July 5, 2019, he was named the U16 team coach for Mega Bemax.

On 26 May 2021, OKK Beograd named Petrović as their new assistant coach.

References

External links
 Veselin Petrović at euroleague.com
 Veselin Petrović at eurobasket.com

1977 births
Living people
BC Oostende players
Bosnia and Herzegovina expatriate basketball people in Serbia
KK Budućnost players
KK FMP (1991–2011) players
KK Partizan players
KK Vojvodina players
Serbian expatriate basketball people in Belgium
Serbian expatriate basketball people in Montenegro
Serbian men's basketball coaches
Serbian men's basketball players
Serbs of Bosnia and Herzegovina
Small forwards
Basketball players from Sarajevo